Abū Isḥāq Ibrāhīm al-Mawṣilī (742–804) was an Arab musician of Persian origin who was among the greatest composers of the early Abbasid period. After Arab and Persian musical training in Ray, he was called to the Abbasid capital of Baghdad where he served under three successive Abbasid caliphs: Al-Mahdi, Al-Hadi and Harun al-Rashid. He became particularly close with the latter and emerged as the leading musician of his time. He championed the conservative school of Arab music against progressives such as Ibn Jami. His son and student Ishaq al-Mawsili would succeed him as the leader of the conservative tradition and his other pupils included the musicians Mukhariq, Zalzal and Ziryab. He appears in numerous stories of One Thousand and One Nights.

Life and career
Born in Kufa, in his early years his parents died and he was trained by an uncle. After a year he went to Rayy, where he met an ambassador of the caliph al-Mansur, who enabled him to come to Basra and take singing lessons. Singing, not study, attracted him, and at the age of twenty-three he fled to Mosul, where he joined a band of wild youths. His fame as a singer spread, and the caliph al-Mahdi brought him to the court. There he remained a favorite under al-Hadi, while Harun al-Rashid kept him always with him until his death, when he ordered his son al-Ma'mun to say the prayer over his corpse.

He had many pupils, chief among them his son Ishaq al-Mawsili, the freedman slave Mukhariq, the lutenist Zalzal, as well as the musician Ziryab.

See the Preface to Ahlwardt's Abu Nowas (Greifswald, 1861), pp. 13–18, and the many stories of his life in the Kitab al-Aghani, V. 2-49.

References

Sources
Books

 

Journal and encyclopedia articles

 
  
 
  
 
 
 
  
 
 
 

742 births
804 deaths
8th-century people from the Abbasid Caliphate
9th-century people from the Abbasid Caliphate
8th-century writers
9th-century writers
Musicians from the Abbasid Caliphate
Composers of the medieval Islamic world
Courtiers of the Abbasid Caliphate
Medieval singers
People from Kufa
8th-century Arabic poets
8th-century Iranian people
9th-century Iranian people
Iranian male singers
One Thousand and One Nights characters
9th-century Arabic poets
Medieval Arabic singers